Bad Lands is a 1939 Western film. Bad Lands is a remake of John Ford's The Lost Patrol, with the locale changed from the Mesopotamian to the Arizona desert.

Plot summary

In 1875, a posse headed by sheriff Sheriff Bill Cummings (Robert Barrat) is held at bay by Apache warriors. The posse members are picked off, one by one, until only the Sheriff is left.

Cast
 Robert Barrat as Sheriff Bill Cummings
 Noah Beery Jr. as Chick Lyman
 Guinn 'Big Boy' Williams as Billy Sweet
 Andy Clyde as Cluff
 Paul Hurst as Curly Tom
 Robert Coote as Eaton
 Addison Richards as Rayburn
 Douglas Walton as Bob Mulford
 Francis Ford as Charlie Garth
 Francis McDonald as Manuel Lopez

Reception
According to the RKO records the film had a loss of $6,000.

References

External links
 Bad Lands at IMDb
 
 
 

1939 films
1939 Western (genre) films
American Western (genre) films
Films scored by Roy Webb
Films set in 1875
Films set in Arizona
RKO Pictures films
American black-and-white films
1930s English-language films
Films directed by Lew Landers
1930s American films